The Lübeck-Travemünde F.2 was a 1910s German reconnaissance floatplane. The F.2 was an improved version of the company's earlier F.1 floatplane and was the first armed aircraft built by Flugzeugwerft Lübeck-Travemünde GmbH, a subsidiary of Deutsche Flugzeug-Werke. The F.2 was a twin-float biplane powered by a 220 hp (164 kW) Mercedes D.IV engine. With a crew of two (pilot and observer), the observer's rear cockpit was fitted with a 7.92 mm (0.31 in) Parabellum machine gun. Eleven aircraft were built.

Operators

Kaiserliche Marine

Royal Norwegian Navy Air Service (F.4)

Specifications

See also

References

Notes

Bibliography

 

F.2
1910s German military reconnaissance aircraft
Single-engined tractor aircraft
Biplanes
Floatplanes
Aircraft first flown in 1914